Halloweentown is a 1998 Disney Channel Original Movie directed by Duwayne Dunham. The first installment in Halloweentown series starring Debbie Reynolds, Kimberly J. Brown, Joey Zimmerman, and Judith Hoag. It is the fourth Disney Channel Original Movie. It centers on Marnie, who on her 13th Halloween, learns she's a witch, discovers a secret portal, and is transported to Halloweentown—a magical place where ghosts and ghouls, witches and werewolves live apart from the human world: but she soon finds herself battling wicked warlocks, evil curses, and endless surprises.

Plot
The film opens with Marnie Piper and her mother, Gwen, arguing over why she and her younger siblings Dylan and Sophie cannot go out for Halloween. Gwen's mother Aggie shows up for her annual Halloween visit. The children are happier to see Aggie than Gwen is, as Aggie openly encourages the children to get more involved in Halloween. Aggie and Gwen are secretly witches, but Gwen is determined to live a normal life as a mortal instead.

Despite objections from Gwen, Aggie is intent on training Marnie as a witch. Before heading home, Aggie reads the children a bedtime story called "Halloweentown", about a mystical place where witches, vampires and monsters of all sorts live in peace away from mortals. Sophie points out a drawing of a witch in the book that resembles Marnie; Aggie does nothing to stop Marnie from imagining such a thing. After putting the children to bed, Gwen and Aggie get into an argument, with Marnie, who has sneaked downstairs, eavesdropping. Gwen is angry that her mother encourages the children to enjoy Halloween, and insists Marnie will be raised as a mortal, like her father was, and not a witch, revealing Marnie is actually a witch too. Aggie doesn't understand why Gwen wants to live without magic, and wants to train Marnie before she turns 13, as at this point without training, she would lose her powers forever. Aggie then asks Gwen for help; citizens of Halloweentown have been disappearing, and while Gwen doesn't take this seriously and says it is possible that the missing have simply moved, Aggie believes that foul play is involved.

When Aggie leaves to return home, Marnie and Dylan covertly follow her. They see Aggie getting onto a magical bus, and sneak onto it through the back door. When they arrive in Halloweentown, Aggie does not see Marnie and Dylan getting off the bus, and the children lose sight of her. At the same time, Marnie and Dylan realize that Sophie had snuck onto the bus with them. They begin looking for Aggie, and are approached by Kalabar, the mayor of Halloweentown. He whistles for a cab driven by Benny, a skeleton with a bad sense of humor. The children find their grandmother's mansion, and against her better judgment, Aggie decides not to take them back to their home immediately. She says she will start Marnie's witch training, but has to take care of "the bad thing" first. She shows her grandchildren what she is talking about: in her cauldron, a vision of a hooded figure appears, laughing maniacally. She says she must activate Merlin's talisman with a spell and potion to defeat the evil creature.

After trying, and failing, to light the talisman with "instant" potion, Aggie takes the children back to town to shop for the right ingredients. The family is introduced to Luke, a goblin who was made handsome by a "shadow creature". He makes a clumsy pass at Marnie, which she turns down on the spot. Gwen, who had noticed her children were missing and immediately blamed Aggie, arrives in Halloweentown to retrieve them, much to Marnie's objections. Gwen tells the children to say goodbye to Aggie, then takes them to the bus station, but cannot find another bus back to the mortal world according to a two-headed ticket vendor, whose two heads are constantly arguing with each other, and decides to see if the mayor can do anything to help. She is shocked to see that the mayor is Kalabar, an ex-boyfriend of hers. After Kalabar briefly leaves to handle another problem, Gwen and her children see Aggie walking somewhere with Luke. Sensing Aggie might be in trouble, they follow Luke and her to an abandoned movie theater.

Aggie meets the hooded demon in the theater, where the missing Halloweentown citizens have been frozen in time. Aggie declines to give the talisman to the demon. Gwen and the children enter the theater as Luke rushes out in fear. The demon freezes Gwen and Aggie. The children escape, and obtain the necessary ingredientsthe hair of a werewolf, the sweat of a ghost, and a vampire's fangto make the potion that will activate the talisman. They then realize they must place the talisman in the large jack-o'-lantern in the center of the town to defeat the demon.

When they arrive to install it, the demon suddenly appears and reveals himself to be Kalabar, who is bitter that Gwen (whom he used to date when she was a teenager) chose to marry a human instead of him. He starts talking to the townspeople and tries to persuade them to join him and take over the mortal world. With the help of Luke, Marnie slips past Kalabar long enough to climb up onto the jack-o'-lantern and try to place the talisman inside. Kalabar, noticing this, casts a spell to freeze her. As she is about to pass out, Marnie drops the talisman inside the jack-o'-lantern, which causes it to illuminate. This unfreezes her and everyone trapped inside the theater, and severely weakens Kalabar. Kalabar obtains the talisman and says he will use it to become the ruler of both the mortal and magical world. Dylan is revealed to have magic powers and eventually joins Gwen, Aggie, and his sisters in confronting Kalabar and using their combined powers to defeat him. Luke is restored to his goblin appearance.

The film ends with the family getting on the bus and blasting off to the mortal world. Gwen and Aggie decide to train Marnie as a witch and Aggie decides to stay in the mortal world to spend more time with her grandchildren.

Cast
 Kimberly J. Brown as Marnie Piper, a 13-year-old witch of the Cromwell family, and the main protagonist. 
 Debbie Reynolds as Splendora Agatha “Aggie” Cromwell, a witch from Halloweentown.
 Judith Hoag as Gwendolyn "Gwen" Piper, the mother of Marnie, Dylan and Sophie and the daughter of Agatha.
 Joey Zimmerman as Dylan Piper, Marnie's 12-year-old brother, who is a warlock of the Cromwell family.
 Emily Roeske as Sophie Piper, Marnie's 7-year-old sister, who is a witch of the Cromwell family.
 Phillip Van Dyke as Luke, a 13-year-old goblin who is under Kalabar's spell that turned him into a human to make him look handsome.
 Robin Thomas as Kalabar, the Mayor of Halloweentown, and the main antagonist, with sinister plans for the humans.
 Judith M. Ford as Harriet, a witch who is a friend of Aggie.
 Kenneth Choi as Hip Salescreature, an unspecified creature who sells witch brooms.
 Hank Cartwright and Tim Tolces as Two-Headed Man, a worker at the Halloweentown Bus Station whose heads bicker with each other.
 Johnny Ulsendigger as a ghost at Halloweentown's fitness center whose sweat is secretly claimed by the Cromwells.
 Sherilyn Lawson as Vampire Dentist Patient, an unnamed vampire whose removed tooth is secretly claimed by the Cromwells.
 J.W. Crawford as the Dentist-Creature who specializes on Vampire fangs. 
 Michael Patrick Egan as Wolfie, a werewolf hairstylist whose hair sample is secretly claimed by the Cromwells.
 Rino Romano as the voice of Benny, a skeleton taxi driver.

Production

Development
Steve White, in the 1970s and 1980s used to be the head of NBC's 'Movie and Mini-Series' department. In 1986 he left the company to establish his own production company, Steve White Entertainment.

The Wonderful World of Disney which had been airing on NBC since 1988, was a sought-after property that ABC wanted to return to the network. NBC agreed to transfer the show to ABC on the condition that Walt Disney Television produce six-movies for their network in return. In 1991, Sheri Singer the "Senior Vice-President of TV Movies" for Walt Disney Television was to collaborate with Steve White on up to three movies to fulfil the contract with NBC.

After working together, they began dating and in 1993, Steve and Sheri married. Towards the end of Sheri's time as an executive for Disney, Steve came up to her one day and said, "I don't know where to go with this but my daughter said to me, 'Dad, where do all the creatures from Halloween go the rest of the year when its not October 31?'" Dubbed Halloweentown the concept was pitched to NBC as part of the six-movie deal, and the network bought it. With the green-light, Singer and White approached screenwriter Paul Bernbaum to write the script. Bernbaum took inspiration from his own life, and used the names of his children, Marnie, Dylan, and Sophie as the protagonists. Since the movie was to air in the 9pm timeslot, the film was geared towards an adult demographic. As a result original script was much darker and mature. In 1994, the script was presented to NBC, and the network decided to pass on the project. Singer ended up leaving the Walt Disney Company at the end of January 1994.

In 1997, Singer and White established, Singer/White Entertainment, and returned to the idea of Halloweentown. The duo pitched it to Disney Channel who initially passed on the project as well. The executives at the network changed their mind after they aired Under Wraps, which was well received. The network returned to Singer/White Entertainment and the film was redeveloped into more of a children's film.

In a 2018 interview with Insider, director Duwayne Dunham revealed the film was presented to him as a, "$20 million to $30 million project" — but the budget ended up only being $4 million.

Casting
After receiving the go ahead from Disney Channel, Singer/White Entertainment began casting. The first person cast for the film was Debbie Reynolds, who at the time had just decided to venture into television work. A list of actors were purposed to Singer/White, and Sheri Singer said, "When we saw the list, we took one look at her name and said, oh my god, would she really do it? This is absolutely unbelievably blessed and terrific idea for casting... We never went to anyone else."

In September 2016, Kimberly J. Brown recalled her audition for the film which she had to react to the conversation where it's revealed the character Marnie is a witch. Brown read for the role twice before being cast.

In a 2020 Galaxy Con question-and answer panel, Judith Hoag revealed she had a meeting with the head of Disney Television where she read for the part. Hoag, who had previously played April O'Neil said "I kind of knew in the room that I had gotten the job because his son was a die-hard Ninja Turtle fan."

According to Singer, the hardest role to cast was that of antagonist Kalabar, "...he had to be scary-but-Disney-Channel-scary." Robin Thomas, who had previously worked with White on Amityville Dollhouse was brought in to audition, and was the final choice.

Pre-production
After Kimberly J. Brown was cast as Marnie, artists used a photo of her to create the "Halloweentown" book prop. The image of the witch flying across the page needed to resemble the actress.

The initial ending of the film featured Marnie traveling deep into an enchanted forest to place the talisman. With each step the character was supposed to grow older the deeper into the forest she went, the make-up department took a life-mask of Kimberly J. Brown to make the different prosthetics to age Marnie. Before the make-up process was completed, the ending was rewritten to the character placing the talisman in the Jack-o'-lantern.

Filming
Halloweentown was filmed in St. Helens, Oregon, and Scappoose, Oregon from May to June 1998, across 24-days. The 'Nob Hill Riverview' bed and breakfast in Saint Helens was used for exterior shots of Aggie Cromwell's Halloweentown home. The voice of the skeleton Benny was added in post-production, as a result the actors on set were performing opposite a voice-less animatronic.

While filming a dance scene in the theater Debbie Reynolds pulled a muscle, Singer recalled Reynolds saying, "You know what, I've been doing this for years and years. I've danced with pulled muscles and pain and I'm not going to hold [production] up." Singer went on to say how impressive it was for the young actors on set to see what "real work ethic" was.

The final scene shot was of Marnie and Aggie flying. Filming took a whole day, and used the actors against a blue-screen.

Reception
On Rotten Tomatoes the film has an approval rating of 80% based on reviews from 5 critics, with an average rating of 5.7/10.

Complex magazine put Halloweentown as number nine on its "The 40 Best Disney Channel Original Movies" list. Katie Heaney for BuzzFeed called the first three movies one of the best things about Halloween.

Sequels
Halloweentown was followed by three sequels: Halloweentown II: Kalabar's Revenge in 2001, Halloweentown High in 2004 and Return to Halloweentown in 2006.

See also
 Halloweentown series

References

External links

 
 

Halloweentown (film series)
Films shot in Oregon
1998 television films
1998 films
1990s English-language films
Films scored by Mark Mothersbaugh
Films about witchcraft
Films directed by Duwayne Dunham
American films about Halloween
1990s monster movies
American monster movies
1990s American films